Georges Fleury (born 18 February 1878 – died 10 March 1968) was a French professional racing cyclist who last rode for the Le Globe team.

Fleury was named on the startlist for 7 Tour de France editions, managing to finish 5 of them including one in the top ten of the general classification at the 1908 Tour de France.

Major results

1904
 3rd Bordeaux–Paris
1906
 7th Bordeaux–Paris
 10th Paris–Roubaix
1908
 7th Overall Tour de France
1909
 3rd Paris–Calais
1910
 6th Bordeaux–Paris

Grand Tour general classification results timeline

References

External links

1878 births
1968 deaths
French male cyclists
Sportspeople from Orléans
Cyclists from Centre-Val de Loire